Bulldog lightfish, also known as Ichthyococcus irregularis, is a species of the genus Ichthyococcus.

References

Ichthyococcus
Fish described in 1958